The 1836 United States presidential election in New York took place between November 3 and December 7, 1836, as part of the 1836 United States presidential election. Voters chose 42 representatives, or electors to the Electoral College, who voted for President and Vice President.

New York voted for the Democratic candidate, Martin Van Buren, over Whig candidate William Henry Harrison. Van Buren won New York by a margin of 9.26%.

Results

See also
 United States presidential elections in New York

References

New York
1836
1836 New York (state) elections